Meridian–Forest Historic District is a national historic district located at Brazil, Clay County, Indiana.  The district encompasses 220 contributing buildings and 13 contributing structures in a predominantly residential section of Brazil. The district developed between about 1866 and 1940, and includes notable examples of Italianate, Romanesque Revival, and Queen Anne style architecture. The district is characterized by brick streets and alleys. Notable buildings include the First Methodist Church, First Presbyterian Church, Masonic Lodge, Carnegie Library, and Brazil Junior High School.

It was added to the National Register of Historic Places in 1997.

References

Historic districts on the National Register of Historic Places in Indiana
Italianate architecture in Indiana
Romanesque Revival architecture in Indiana
Queen Anne architecture in Indiana
Historic districts in Clay County, Indiana
National Register of Historic Places in Clay County, Indiana